The Museum of Tropical Queensland (abbreviated MTQ) is a museum of natural history, archaeology and history located in Townsville, Queensland, Australia. It is located in the same complex as the Reef HQ Aquarium. MTQ is a member of the Queensland Museum Campus Network.

History

The museum opened in 1987 as the "North Queensland Branch" of the Queensland Museum, under the direction of Curator-in-Charge Dr. Carden Wallace.

In 1997, Carden Wallace was named director of the museum. Its current building was constructed at a cost of 18 million Australian dollars, and was opened on 3 June 2000 by the then Queensland Premier Peter Beattie.

In 2003, Sally Lewis was named director of the museum and two years later Spinderella the giant silver orb spider was unveiled. It overlooks Flinders Street East. In 2007, Peter McLeod was named director of the museum.

in 2022, the Museum of Tropical Queensland partnered with the Museum of Underwater Art to showcase sculptures created by Jason deCaires Taylor as part of the Ocean Sentinels above the surface exhibition. These sculptures of scientists, conservationists and traditional owners include John Veron and Maurice Yonge.

Research
Scientists in the museum have gained international recognition in various fields, particularly those with marine themes.

Marine archaeology
The museum houses artefacts recovered from the wreck of HMS Pandora, one of the most significant wrecks in Australian waters. The Pandora sank off the coast of north Queensland in 1791 after capturing some of the participants in the infamous mutiny on the Bounty.

The Maritime Archaeology Section administers the Historic Shipwrecks Act 1976, which covers sites including HMS Pandora and SS Yongala wrecks. Access to these sites is through permit only.

Marine megafauna
In 2006, worldwide attention was received for the discovery of the Australian snubfin dolphin, the first species of dolphin to be discovered in 56 years.

Corals
The museum also houses what has been described as "the scientifically most important coral collection in the world".

Images

References

External links

Museums in Queensland
Archaeological museums in Australia
Natural history museums in Australia
Museums established in 1987
Museum of Tropical Queensland
Maritime museums in Australia
1987 establishments in Australia
Tropical Queensland